The 2021–22 season was the 54th season of the Northern Premier League. The league consists of four divisions, the Premier Division at Step 3 of the National League System, and the West, East and Midlands divisions at Step 4. The NPL continued this season with main sponsors Entain's Pitching In.

As the previous season was curtailed due to the COVID-19 pandemic, with all results finalised, the Trident Leagues along with The Football Association decided to make the realignment to leagues at Steps 4, 5 and 6.

Premier Division

The Premier Division comprised the same set of 22 teams which competed in the aborted competition the previous season.

League table

Top goalscorers

Results table

Play-offs

Semi-finals

Final

Stadia and locations

Division One West

When the divisions were realigned this became Division One West instead of Division One North West from the previous season. Division One West comprised 20 teams.

Team changes
The following 3 clubs were promoted from the North West Counties League:
 1874 Northwich
 Bootle
 Warrington Rylands 1906

The following 5 clubs transferred from Division One South East:
 Leek Town
 Newcastle Town
 Kidsgrove Athletic
 Glossop North End
 Market Drayton Town

League table

Top goalscorers

Results table

Play-offs

Semi-finals

Final

Stadia and locations

Division One East

When the divisions were realigned this became Division One East instead of Division One South East from the previous season. Division One East comprised 19 teams, with a vacancy left due to the withdrawal of Droylsden in the previous campaign.

Team changes
The following six clubs were promoted from Step 5 divisions:
 Bridlington Town – promoted from Northern Counties East League Premier Division
 Hebburn Town – promoted from Northern League Division One
 Liversedge – promoted from Northern Counties East League Premier Division
 Shildon – promoted from Northern League Division One
 Stockton Town – promoted from Northern League Division One
 Yorkshire Amateur – promoted from Northern Counties East League Premier Division

The following seven clubs transferred from the Division One North West:
 Dunston UTS
 Marske United
 Tadcaster Albion
 Pickering Town
 Brighouse Town
 Pontefract Collieries
 Ossett United

League table

Top goalscorers

Results table

Play-offs

Semi-finals

Final

Stadia and locations

Division One Midlands

As part of the realignment, the delayed formation of a third Northern Premier League First Division saw the creation of a new Midlands Division, in which it covers the Birmingham area, Nottinghamshire, western Northamptonshire and northern Cambridgeshire regions. The division consists of 20 sides for its inaugural season.

Team changes
The following 2 clubs were promoted from Step 5 divisions:
 Shepshed Dynamo – promoted from United Counties League
 Sporting Khalsa – promoted from Midland League

The following 9 clubs transferred from the NPL Division One South East:
 Belper Town
 Carlton Town
 Chasetown
 Ilkeston Town
 Loughborough Dynamo
 Stamford
 Sutton Coldfield Town
 Spalding United
 Wisbech Town

The following 9 clubs also transferred from other Step 4 Trident Alliance divisions:
 Bedworth United – transferred from Southern League Division Division One Central
 Cambridge City – transferred from Isthmian League North Division
 Coleshill Town – transferred from Southern League Division One Central
 Corby Town – transferred from Southern League Division One Central
 Daventry Town – transferred from Southern League Division One Central
 Halesowen Town – transferred from Southern League Division One Central
 Histon – transferred from Isthmian League North Division
 Soham Town Rangers – transferred from Isthmian League North Division
 Yaxley – transferred from Southern League Division One Central

League table

Top goalscorers

Results table

Play-off

Semi-finals

Final

Inter-step play-off

Stadia and locations

Relegation reprieves

Step 3
Seven clubs at Step 3, all four fourth-from-bottom teams and those placed third-from-bottom that are the top three on a points per game (PPG) basis, were reprieved from relegation. The remaining team was relegated to Step 4.

The final points-per-game ranking of the third-from-bottom placed teams in Step 3 divisions was as follows:

Source:

Step 4
Ten of the 16 clubs at Step 4, all eight fourth-from-bottom teams and two sides placed third-from-bottom, one at the top and the other in third place on a points per game (PPG) basis, were reprieved from contesting relegation play-offs. The FA granted third-placed Sheffield a reprieve after Yorkshire Amateur's demotion. The remaining six teams contested one-off matches with six runners-up from Step 5 that had the fewest PPG at the end of the 2021–22 season. Three winners of their matches stayed at Step 4 for the 2022–23 season, while three others lost theirs and were relegated to Step 5.

The final points-per-game ranking of the 3rd-from-bottom-placed teams in Step 4 divisions was also as follows:

Source:

Challenge Cup
For the second successive season, it was announced to member clubs that the League Challenge Cup was cancelled due to any further fixture disruptions that might have occurred during to the COVID-19 pandemic.

See also
Northern Premier League
2021–22 Isthmian League
2021–22 Southern League

Notes

References

External links
Official website

Northern Premier League seasons
2021–22 in English football leagues
2021–22 in European seventh tier association football leagues